Adam Joseph (born Adam Joseph Hodges; January 10, 1982) is an American singer-songwriter, and music producer. Joseph has released two albums and 16 singles during his career. He is also the president of his own recording label, Jah Records. Joseph has composed and written songs for many singers including Jonny McGovern, Ari Gold, Lea Lorien, Alex Kassel, and other recording artists and musicians.

Following the establishment of his record label, he released his debut studio album How I Seem to Be, which spawned two singles: "Flow with My Soul" and "You're Mine". He released a single, "Faggoty Attention", in 2007 which generated international attention. The song was featured in the film A Four Letter Word. Joseph later recorded with several other singers and made album appearances. In 2012, he signed with Gomination Records and released a single "Turn Me Out". Joseph released "What's A Lover to Do" in 2013 from his second album Love Philosophy, released in February 2014.

Early life
In 1993, he attended the School for Creative and Performing Arts in Cincinnati, Ohio. In 2000, Joseph attended Berklee College of Music in Boston, Massachusetts. In 2003, he graduated with intense training in music production and engineering, vocal performance, and music business.

Music career

2003–2007: How I Seem to Be
In 2003, Joseph established his self-owned record label Jah Records. In December 2003, he released his first album "How I Seem to Be". Joseph wrote, arranged, and produced the entire album. The music video for album's first single "Flow with My Soul" received heavy rotation on MTV's Logo Network. In 2004, he moved to New York City, where he created Elegant Children Productions, his own production company. The music video for the second single "You're Mine" aired on Logo in 2007.

In 2006, Joseph joined electronica-pop-rap crossover group Team Pimp. The group consists of Jonny McGovern, Linda James, Maxi J, Ericka Toure Aviance, and Adam Joseph. As Team Pimp, the group recorded several songs including "Somethin' for the Fellas (That Like the Fellas)", "Bossy Bottom", and "Dick Swang Out!", which appeared on Jonny McGovern's second album "Gays Gone Wild".

2007–2012: Faggoty Attention and TransporTour
In 2007, Joseph released a single entitled "Faggoty Attention". The music video (directed by Francis Legge) received heavy rotation on Logo. In the same year, Joseph began producing records for Ari Gold, Jason Walker, and Jonny McGovern.

In 2008, Joseph released a maxi-single for "Faggoty Attention". Joseph also toured with Ari Gold and Kelly King on the TransporTour. In 2009, Joseph released a cover of CeCe Peniston's 1990s dance hit "Finally". In November 2009, Joseph released a single entitled "Takin' You Home (for Christmas)". In 2010, Joseph was featured on Bob Sinclar's album Born in 69 on the song "The Way I Feel". In 2012, Joseph released a series of single-only releases.

2013–present: Love Philosophy
In 2013, Joseph released the single 'What's a Lover to Do'. In February 2014, he released his second album Love Philosophy. In April 2017, Joseph scored a viral hit with "Linda Evangelista", a remix of RuPaul's Drag Race contestant Aja's sarcastic rant toward fellow contestant Valentina ("You're perfect, you're beautiful, you look like Linda Evangelista, you're a model").

Personal life
In 2007, Joseph identified as a gay man.

Discography
Albums
 2003: How I Seem to Be
 2014: Love Philosophy

Singles
 2003: "Flow with My Soul"
 2003: "You're Mine"
 2006: "Faggoty Attention"
 2009: "Takin' You Home (for Christmas)"
 2009: "Finally"
 2010: "Can't Stop" (Noel G. featuring Adam Joseph)
 2011: "Chasing the Dream" (with Alex Kassel)
 2012: "No Sleep Tonight"
 2012: "Racing After Love" (Mafia Mike featuring Adam Joseph)
 2012: "All for You" (Plastik Funk featuring Adam Joseph)
 2012: "Music Sounds Better with You" (Wet Fingers featuring Adam Joseph)
 2012: "Turn Me Out"
 2012: "Turn Me Out" (Remix)
 2013: "One"
 2013: "Believe"
 2013: "What's a Lover to Do"
 2015: "Radiant" (with DJ Inox)
 2015: "Sinner"
 2016: "Home" (Dzeko & Torres featuring Adam Joseph)
 2016: "One Good Thing" (Box Office Poison aka Snax (musician) featuring Adam Joseph)
 2017: "Linda Evangelista" (featuring Aja)
 2018: "Voguing Right Now" (featuring Vanessa Hudgens)
 2018: "Cookies" (featuring Vanessa Vanjie Mateo)
 2018: "The Walmart Yodel" (featuring Mason Ramsey)
 2019: "OPALANNNNNCE" (featuring Mercedes Iman Diamond)
 2019: "100 People" (featuring Lady Gaga)
 2019:  "Gravity" (featuring Zach Adam)

Album appearances

Music videos

Filmography

Awards and nominations
Glammy Awards
 2008: Best Vocalist – Winner
 2009: Best Male Performer – Nominated
 2009: Best Vocalist – Winner
 2010: Best Vocalist – Winner
 2010: Best Male Performer – Nominated
 2011: Best Male Performer – Nominated
 2012: Best Male Performer – Nominated

OutMusic Awards
 2004: Outstanding New Recording – Male for "How I Seem to Be" – Nominated
 2004: Outstanding Debut Recording – Male for "How I Seem to Be" – Nominated
 2004: Out Song of the Year for "Flow With My Soul" – Nominated

References

External links
 
 

1982 births
Living people
American male singer-songwriters
American male pop singers
American LGBT singers
American LGBT songwriters
American gay actors
Gay singers
Gay composers
Gay songwriters
Place of birth missing (living people)
American gay musicians
American house musicians
American dance musicians
American contemporary R&B singers
American soul singers
21st-century American male singers
21st-century LGBT people